Nancy from Nowhere is a lost 1922 American silent romantic comedy film directed by Chester Franklin and starring Bebe Daniels. It was produced by Realart Pictures and distributed by Paramount Pictures.

Plot
As described in a film magazine, Jack Halliday discovers Nancy, a poor young mountain woman, being mistreated by her foster parents, Mr. and Mrs. Kelly. He takes her to the city where she blossoms into a society bud. However, Nancy returns to her mountain hut because she does not want to ruin his prospects socially by marrying him. Jack follows her back and finds her in the clutches of a villain, which he whips and then runs off with Nancy to the nearest parson to be wed.

Cast
Bebe Daniels as Nancy
Eddie Sutherland as Jack Halliday
Vera Lewis as Mrs. Kelly
James Gordon as Mr. Kelly
Myrtle Stedman as Mrs. Halliday
Alberta Lee as Martha
Helen Holly as Elizabeth Doane
Dorothy Hagan as Mrs. Doane

References

External links

Lantern slide at the George Eastman House Motion Picture Collection (Wayback Machine)

American silent feature films
Paramount Pictures films
Lost American films
1922 romantic comedy films
American romantic comedy films
Films directed by Chester Franklin
American black-and-white films
1922 lost films
Lost romantic comedy films
1920s American films
Silent romantic comedy films
Silent American comedy films
1920s English-language films
English-language romantic comedy films